Nicholas Piccininni  (born December 16, 1996) is an American professional mixed martial artist and graduated folkstyle wrestler who currently competes in the flyweight division. As a wrestler, Piccininni became a three–time NCAA Division I All-American and a four–time Big 12 Conference champion out of the Oklahoma State University for John Smith.

Wrestling career

High school 
Piccininni was born and raised in East Setauket, New York, and went on to attend Ward Melville High School. He made the varsity team in wrestling when he was in the eighth grade, year in which he placed third at the state championships. He won the state title in every year of high school, making him a four–time NYSPHSAA champion at four different weight classes (106, 113, 120 & 126 respectively). He also competed at FloNationals, tournament in which he was the runner-up on 2013 and the champion on 2014. He graduated with a record of 226–3 and was awarded the 2015 Dave Schultz High School Excellence Award. After graduation, Piccininni committed to the Oklahoma State University to wrestle for the Cowboys.

College 
After compiling a 16–4 record in open tournaments, claiming the OCU Open and the Bob Smith Open titles as a redshirting athlete, Piccininni went 27–8 during his freshman season (2016–2017) competing at 125 pounds, and went on to claim his first Big 12 Conference title before the NCAAs. At the National tournament, he went 5–2 with both losses coming from returning NCAA runner–up from Iowa Thomas Gilman, to place fourth and earn All–American honors. As a sophomore (2017–2018), Piccininni claimed his second Big 12 title in a row, pinning Zeke Moisey from West Virginia in the finals. After two wins, Piccininni was pinned by freshman phenom and three–time age–group World Champion from Iowa Spencer Lee (eventual winner of the championship) at the NCAAs, and went on to be eliminated by Ethan Lizak from Minnesota after losing by technical fall, compiling an overall record of 24–5 and not placing at the tournament despite his sixth seed.

Piccininni showed major improvements as a junior (2018–2019), building his record up to an undefeated 31–0 record before the NCAAs, notably avenging his loss to the now returning NCAA champion from Iowa Spencer Lee and claiming his third Big 12 Conference title. At the National tournament, Piccininni racked up three wins before once again losing to Lee and getting thrown to consolations, where after being downed by 2016 Cadet World Championship runner–up from Cornell Vito Arujau, he got a win over Pat Glory to place fifth and secure his second All–American mention.

In his senior year (2019–2020) he captured 26 wins and 2 losses, became the ninth Cowboy to win four conference titles when he defeated Alex Mackall from Iowa State in the finals of the Big 12 Conference championships. Piccininni was the third–seeded wrestler for the 2020 NCAA Championships, however, the event was cancelled due to the COVID-19 pandemic, rendering him and all the qualifiers unable to compete. Piccininni earned first–team NWCA All–American honors after the season.

Piccininni graduated from the Oklahoma State University with a 112–17 record, four Big 12 Conference titles and three All–American honors.

Freestyle 
During his academic years, Piccinini did not compete very regularly in freestyle. In June 2018, he competed at the US U23 Nationals, where after a four–match win streak he was quickly downed by Vito Arujau, placing sixth. A year later, he competed at the 2019 US Open in April, going 3–2. He made another brief appearance at the 2019 Beat the Streets of May, where he was tech'd by Jack Mueller.

Coaching 
In April 2020, it was announced that Piccininni had joined the coaching staff of the wrestling team at Gilroy High School along notable athletes from AKA such as Daniel Cormier and Deron Winn.

Mixed martial arts career

Early career 
In April 2020, Piccininni announced his transition to MMA and signed a contract with Zinkin Entertainment & Sports Management. He started training at American Kickboxing Academy, MMA powerhouse where former Cowboys such as Daniel Cormier and Kyle Crutchmer train. Piccininni made his professional debut in June 18, 2021, at XFN 371, winning by submission in the first round.

He made his sophomore appearance in the sport against Joseph McCormick at XFN 376 on December 10, 2021. He won the bout via first-round submission.

His third bout took place on June 24, 2022, at XFN 381 against Shawn Gustafson. He won the bout via unanimous decision.

He then faced Freddie Rodriguez at Fury FC 72 on December 18, 2022. He won the bout via first-round submission.

Championships and accomplishments

Folkstyle wrestling 
National Collegiate Athletic Association
NCAA Division I All–American out of the Oklahoma State University (2017, 2019)
Big 12 Conference
Big 12 Conference 125 lbs Championship out of the Oklahoma State University  (2017, 2018, 2019, 2020)
New York State Public High School Athletic Association
NYSPHSAA State Champion out of Ward Melville High School (2012, 2013, 2014, 2015)
NYSPHSAA All-State out of Ward Melville High School (2011, 2012, 2013, 2014, 2015)

Mixed martial arts record 
 

|-
|Win
|align=center|4–0
|Freddie Rodriguez
|Submission (arm-triangle choke)
|Fury FC 72
|
|align=center|1
|align=center|3:11
|Houston, Texas, United States
|
|-
|Win
|align=center|3–0
|Shawn Gustafson
|Decision (unanimous)
|XFN 381
|
|align=center|3
|align=center|5:00
|Tulsa, Oklahoma, United States
|
|-
|Win
|align=center|2–0
|Joseph McCormick
|Submission (arm-triangle choke)
|XFN 376
|
|align=center|1
|align=center|1:28
|Tulsa, Oklahoma, United States
|
|-
|Win
|align=center|1–0
|Chancey Wilson
|Submission (rear-naked choke)
|XFN 371
|
|align=center|1
|align=center|1:41
|Tulsa, Oklahoma, United States
|

Freestyle record 

! colspan="7"| Senior Freestyle Matches
|-
!  Res.
!  Record
!  Opponent
!  Score
!  Date
!  Event
!  Location
|-
|Loss
|7–4
|align=left| Jack Mueller
|style="font-size:88%"|TF 0–10
|style="font-size:88%"|May 6, 2019
|style="font-size:88%"|2019 Beat The Streets: Grapple at the Garden
|style="text-align:left;font-size:88%;" |
 New York City, New York
|-
! style=background:white colspan=7 | 
|-
|Loss
|7–3
|align=left| Frank Perrelli
|style="font-size:88%"|TF 0–10
|style="font-size:88%" rowspan=5|April 24–27, 2019
|style="font-size:88%" rowspan=5|2019 US Open National Championships
|style="text-align:left;font-size:88%;" rowspan=5|
 Las Vegas, Nevada
|-
|Win
|7–2
|align=left| Bernardino Gomez
|style="font-size:88%"|TF 10–0
|-
|Win
|6–2
|align=left| Ian Timmins
|style="font-size:88%"|8–1
|-
|Loss
|5–2
|align=left| Darian Cruz
|style="font-size:88%"|2–4
|-
|Win
|5–1
|align=left| Christian Sharp
|style="font-size:88%"|TF 10–0
|-
! style=background:white colspan=7 | 
|-
|Loss
|4–1
|align=left| Vito Arujau
|style="font-size:88%"|TF 0–10
|style="font-size:88%" rowspan=5|June 1–3, 2018
|style="font-size:88%" rowspan=5|2018 US U23 National Championships
|style="text-align:left;font-size:88%;" rowspan=5|
 Akron, Ohio
|-
|Win
|4–0
|align=left| Jens Lantz
|style="font-size:88%"|8–1
|-
|Win
|3–0
|align=left| Micky Phillippi
|style="font-size:88%"|2–2
|-
|Win
|2–0
|align=left| Ryan Haskett
|style="font-size:88%"|11–9
|-
|Win
|1–0
|align=left| Hunter Kosco
|style="font-size:88%"|TF 10–0
|-

NCAA record 

! colspan="8"| NCAA Championships Matches
|-
!  Res.
!  Record
!  Opponent
!  Score
!  Date
!  Event
|-
! style=background:white colspan=6 |2019 NCAA Championships 5th at 125 lbs
|-
|Win
|11–6
|align=left|Pat Glory
|style="font-size:88%"|Fall
|style="font-size:88%" rowspan=6|March 20–22, 2019
|style="font-size:88%" rowspan=6|2019 NCAA Division I Wrestling Championships
|-
|Loss
|10–6
|align=left|Vito Arujau
|style="font-size:88%"|1–5
|-
|Loss
|10–5
|align=left|Spencer Lee
|style="font-size:88%"|4–11
|-
|Win
|10–4
|align=left|Pat Glory
|style="font-size:88%"|9–5
|-
|Win
|9–4
|align=left|Elijah Oliver
|style="font-size:88%"|MD 13–2
|-
|Win
|8–4
|align=left|Korbin Meink
|style="font-size:88%"|Fall
|-
! style=background:white colspan=6 |2018 NCAA Championships DNP at 125 lbs
|-
|Loss
|7–4
|align=left|Ethan Lizak
|style="font-size:88%"|TF 0-16
|style="font-size:88%" rowspan=4|March 15–17, 2018
|style="font-size:88%" rowspan=4|2018 NCAA Division I Wrestling Championships
|-
|Loss
|7–3
|align=left|Spencer Lee
|style="font-size:88%"|Fall
|-
|Win
|7–2
|align=left|Sean Russell
|style="font-size:88%"|6-3
|-
|Win
|6–2
|align=left|Travis Piotrowski
|style="font-size:88%"|Fall
|-
! style=background:white colspan=6 |2017 NCAA Championships 4th at 125 lbs
|-
|Loss
|5–2
|align=left|Thomas Gilman
|style="font-size:88%"|6–13
|style="font-size:88%" rowspan=7|March 15–17, 2017
|style="font-size:88%" rowspan=7|2017 NCAA Division I Wrestling Championships
|-
|Win
|5–1
|align=left|Jack Mueller 
|style="font-size:88%"|INJ
|-
|Win
|4–1
|align=left|Sean Russell 
|style="font-size:88%"|SV–1 6–4
|-
|Win
|3–1
|align=left|Brock Hudkins 
|style="font-size:88%"|7–5
|-
|Loss
|2–1
|align=left|Thomas Gilman
|style="font-size:88%"|Fall
|-
|Win
|2–0
|align=left|Josh Rodriguez
|style="font-size:88%"|5–2
|-
|Win
|1–0
|align=left|Elijah Oliver
|style="font-size:88%"|Fall
|-

Stats 

!  Season
!  Year
!  School
!  Rank
!  Weigh Class
!  Record
!  Win
!  Bonus
|-
|2020
|Senior
|rowspan=4|Oklahoma State University
|#3 (DNQ)
|rowspan=4|125
|26–2
|92.86%
|71.43%
|-
|2019
|Junior
|#3 (5th)
|35–2
|94.59%
|75.68%
|-
|2018
|Sophomore
|#7 (DNP)
|24–5
|82.76%
|48.28%
|-
|2017
|Freshman
|#8 (4th)
|27–8
|77.14%
|34.29%
|-
|colspan=5 bgcolor="LIGHTGREY"|Career
|bgcolor="LIGHTGREY"|112–17
|bgcolor="LIGHTGREY"|86.84%
|bgcolor="LIGHTGREY"|57.42%

References

External links 
 

Living people
1996 births
Oklahoma State Cowboys wrestlers
American male sport wrestlers
American male mixed martial artists
Mixed martial artists from New York (state)
Mixed martial artists utilizing collegiate wrestling
People from East Setauket, New York
Flyweight mixed martial artists